Deste Tous (Watch them/Tie them) was a daily Greek television programme. The show premiered on September 13, 2009. The show stars Nikos Moutsinas, Maria Iliaki, Katerina Kenourgiou and George Daskalos.

The show offers prizes for various fashion competitions, such as lame shoe for best-dressed. The Olive slippers are awarded for the worst show of the week.

Reporters 
 Eirini Gkaniatsou
 Nikos Partsolis
 Constantina Vassiliou

See also
 List of programs broadcast by Alpha TV

References

External links
 Official site 
 Official Facebook Page 
 Official Twitter Account 
Dance of Maria Iliaki

Alpha TV original programming
Greek television series
2009 Greek television series debuts
2000s Greek television series